Maa Aur Mamta is a 1970 Indian Hindi-language drama film, produced by Baldev Pushkarna and M.M. Malhotra under the Suchitra Kala Mandir banner and directed by Asit Sen. It stars Jeetendra, Mumtaz, Ashok Kumar, Nutan  and music composed by Laxmikant–Pyarelal.

Plot
Maya (Nutan), a poor girl, is the daughter of a "chaprasi" named Gopal (Shivraj) who works for a kind-hearted Catholic priest, Father Henry (Rehman). One night, while her father is dying, there is a knock on the door. Maya opens it, only to find Father Henry rushing in with a babe in arms. He gives the child in Maya's care and begs her to guard the child until he returns to claim it. Maya's father dies. Father Henry disappears, and Maya is left literally "holding the baby." The local panchayat, believing the worst, drive her away. Coming to Bombay, Maya and the child, whom she has named Ram, find shelter in the home of a good-hearted taxi-driver named Cassim (Jayant). Years pass and Ram (Jeetendra) grows up into a fine and handsome young man, a college-going student. In the course of time, Cassam gives up taxi-driving to become a chauffeur in the employment of Mr. Williams (Ashok Kumar), a wealthy Catholic businessman. Cassim learns that Mrs. Williams (Nirupa Roy) is suffering from a nervous breakdown because she had a son who was spirited away when he was just born, and that child was not found again. Taking pity on Mrs. Williams' condition, Cassim suggests to Maya to take up a job in the Williams household as a nurse to the lady. Here, Maya finds that the Williams have got an adopted son Victor (Roopesh Kumar). This boy is actually the son of Mr. Williams brother Mr. Peter (Karan Dewan) and Mrs. Peter (Shabnam). Both Ram and Victor study in the same college and both of them are claimants for the affections of Mary (Mumtaz) a rich only daughter. Because Mary loves Ram and not Victor, the latter is always taunting Ram about his unknown parentage. He says, "Your mother is a Hindu and your grandfather a Muslim but where is your father?". Events take a dramatic turn when Maya learns the whole story of the disappearance of the Williams real child. She fears that Ram may be snatched away from her at any moment. Rams love, however, is steady as a rock. Even Mary's love cannot make him turn away from his mother Maya. Mary's father wants Ram to get converted before marrying Mary, but Ram refuses, saying "My religion is my mother. I cannot change either." Finally, both Mr. and Mrs. Williams learn the truth. And then fate makes everybody's footsteps converge towards the home of the poor but good-hearted Muslim taxi-driver, where a great drama of emotional turmoil and drama reaches its culmination.

Cast
 Jeetendra as Ram
 Mumtaz as Mary
 Ashok Kumar as William
 Nutan as Maya
 Rehman as Father Henry
 Sujit Kumar as Sunder
 Shabnam
 Roopesh Kumar as Victor
 Nirupa Roy as Polly
 Jayant as Cassim
 Birbal
 Shivraj
 Leela Mishra
 Brahm Bhardwaj as Mary's dad
 Keshto Mukherjee as Drunkard
 Karan Dewan

Soundtrack

External links
 

1970 films
1970s Hindi-language films
1970 drama films
Films scored by Laxmikant–Pyarelal